Adam Radosław Bielecki (born 12 May 1983) is a Polish alpine and high-altitude climber, known for the first winter ascents of the eight-thousanders: Gasherbrum I and Broad Peak. In his book Spod zamarzniętych powiek written with co-author Dominik Szczepański, Bielecki tells the story of his climbings, memories from Himalayan expeditions, and the effort the highest mountains demand.

Early life and education
Adam Bielecki was born in 1983 in Tychy, Poland. He graduated from the Leon Kruczkowski High School No. 1 in Tychy. He studied psychology at the Jagiellonian University in Kraków. At the age of 17, he was the youngest person to climb Khan Tengri in alpine-style.

Career
Bielecki climbs in the sport style, without oxygen support from the bottle.

Eight-thousanders

On September 30, 2011, together with Artur Hajzer and Tomasz Wolfart he summited Makalu (8463m), They climbed the mountain without supplementary oxygen.

On March 9, 2012, Adam Bielecki with Janusz Gołąb made the first successful winter ascent of Gasherbrum I (8080m), thereby also achieving the highest elevation reached by man in winter in the Karakorum. They climbed the mountain without supplementary oxygen.

On July 31, 2012, he summited K2 (8611m) without use of supplemental oxygen.

On March 5, 2013, he climbed Broad Peak (8051m) together with Maciej Berbeka, Artur Małek and Tomasz Kowalski. They climbed the mountain without supplementary oxygen. The climbers separated before the summit, and while Bielecki and Małek reached the camp on descent, Berbeka and Kowalski went missing and were pronounced dead three days later.

On January 27, 2018, Bielecki, along with Denis Urubko, Jaroslaw Botor and Piotr Tomala led a rescue operation on Nanga Parbat to save climbers Élisabeth Revol and Tomasz Mackiewicz, who were stuck on the mountain. All 4 of them had been attempting a winter summit of K2, were brought to the mountain by helicopter. Bielecki and Urubko climbed over 1000m through the night to reach Revol. They succeeded in bringing Revol to safety, but, due to the severe weather conditions, were unable to save Mackiewicz. The K2 expedition ended with no success. Bielecki and his colleagues were awarded Legion of Honour, France's highest distinction for military and civil merits, for this rescue mission.

On July 16 2018, Adam Bielecki with Felix Berg, climbed Gasherbrum II by the west face (probably the second ascent of this face) without supplementary oxygen.

Other Mountains
Bielecki was a leader of multiple expeditions on 5 continents, among other peaks he climbed also: Tilicho Peak, Pik Lenin, Jengish Chokusu (western summit), Damavand, Ararat, Kilimanjaro, Ruwenzori, Mount Kenya, Chimborazo, Cotopaxi, Aconcagua, Denali (Mc Kinley) Dhampus Peak, El Cuerno, Artesonraju, Churup and in the Alps in total 17 four-thousanders, including Mont Blanc, Dufourspitze, Matterhorn.

On August 20, 2017, Bielecki together with Paweł Migas and Jacek Czech climbed in the Cajon del Mapo region of the Andes opening 3 new routes: "Ruta Polaca", "Diedro Polaco" and "La Perdida".

Selected Ascents

Ascents on eight-thousanders
 2011 – Makalu
 2012 – Gasherbrum I (first winter ascent)
 2012 – K2
 2013 – Broad Peak (first winter ascent)
 2018 – Gasherbrum II (by the west face)

Ascents on other mountains
 "Colton-MacIntyre". Grandess Jorasses ED+, 1200m.
 "Shmid route". Matterhorn, TD+, 1100m.
 "Transylvania" Monte Cassale, VII, 1100m.
 "Via Luna 85", PlaccheZebratta, 6c, 400m.
 "Shangri-La" Osterva, VIII.
 "Szewska Pasja", Młynarczyk VII+.
 "Ruta Polaca", Cerro Arenas. TD+, 1000m. First ascent
 "La Perdida", Cerro Arenas. ED-,900m. First Ascent
 "Rubenzahl" Kandersteg. WI6.
 "Juvsola" Rjukan. WI6.
 "Original route" La Esfinge. 6c+/7a, 800m.

Selected awards
 Best of ExplorersWeb 2012 Awards Winner: Gasherbrum I First Winter Ascent
Feat of the year 2012 award by the Polish edition of National Geographic
"The Spirit of Mountaineering Commendation" awarded by British Alpine Club to: Krzysztof Wielicki, Adam Bielecki, Denis Urubko, Jarosław Botor and Piotr Tomala for the rescue action on Nanga Parbat in winter 2018
 David A. Sowles Memorial Award 2019 by American Alpine Club for the Nanga Parbat rescue action for Adam Bielecki, Denis Urubko, Jarosław Botor and Piotr Tomala
 2019 National Geographic Adventurers of the Year, for Adam Bielecki and Denis Urubko
 French Legion of Honour, for his part in the rescue mission on Nanga Parbat in 2019

References

External links
 list of ascent on winterclimb.com , with detailed list of ascents of 1999–2013

1983 births
Living people
Polish mountain climbers
People from Tychy
Sportspeople from Silesian Voivodeship
Mount Ararat